Dick was a merchant ship built in 1788 in Rotherhithe, on the River Thames, England. She initially sailed as a West Indiaman. Her role and whereabouts between 1796 and 1810 are obscure. Later, she made two voyages as a troop transport, one to Ceylon and one to New South Wales. She then made one voyage in 1820 transporting convicts to New South Wales. She was last listed in 1822.

Career
Dick first appeared in Lloyd's Register (LR) in 1789.

Dick disappeared from LR in 1796 and reappeared only in 1812. She first appeared in the Register of Shipping (RS) in 1810 (RS only commenced publishing in 1800). The two sources did not agree on a number of details. The registers were only as accurate as owners chose to keep them.

In 1813 the British East India Company (EIC) had lost its monopoly on the trade between India and Britain. British ships were then free to sail to India or the Indian Ocean under a license from the EIC. Dick presumably brought a cargo from India back to Britain under such a license. 

Although LR showed Dick sailing to India, she did not appear on the annual lists of licensed vessels trading with India. Instead, she initially sailed to New South Wales. 

On 18 March 1817, Dick, Harrison, master, arrived at the Cove of Cork, bound for New South Wales. Dick left Cork, Ireland on 3 April 1817. On 10 May she was at Rio de Janeiro; she sailed again on 11 June. She arrived at Sydney on 3 September 1817. She brought troops in the form of a detachment of the 48th Regiment of Foot commanded by Major Cimitiere. Lieutenant Phillip Parker King was a passenger. Dick left Port Jackson on 5 October, bound for Madras. On 24 December she arrived at Madras. She did not arrive back at Gravesend until 12 September 1818.

On 6 January 1818, Dick, Harrison, master, was at Deal, bound for Ceylon. On 1 February she was at the Cove of Cork. On 23 February she sailed for Ceylon, again serving as a transport. (Sailing as a government transport obviated the need for an EIC license.) She arrived at Madeira on 4 March and sailed on 6 March. On 16 May she was at the Cape of Good Hope and sailed on the 28th. She arrived at Colombo on 28 July. She sailed on to Bengal. She sailed from Colombo on 23 January 1819, presumably having returned there from Bengal. She arrived at deal on 16 May from the Cape and Ceylon.

Convict voyage (1820–1821): Under the command of William Harrison and surgeon Robert Armstrong, Dick sailed from London, England on 4 November 1820 and arrived at Sydney on 12 March 1821. She had embarked 140 male convicts and had no deaths en route. The guard consisted of detachments of the 24th Regiment of Foot, under the command of Lieutenant Isaacson of the 47th Regiment of Foot. 

Dick, Harrison, master, arrived at Batavia on 21 June. On 8 August Dick, Harrison, master, was still at Batavia, loading. She had lost anchors and cables on her way there from New South Wales. She arrived at St Helena on 31 December from Batavia. On 13 March 1822 Dick arrived at Gravesend, having lost an anchor between Deal and Margate.

Dick was last listed in Lloyd's Register for 1822.

Citations and references
Citations

References

 

1788 ships
Ships built on the River Thames
Convict ships to New South Wales
Age of Sail merchant ships
Merchant ships of the United Kingdom